Goin is an unincorporated community in Claiborne County, Tennessee. It is located near State Route 33 west of Tazewell.

The community was named after the local Goin family (variant spelling of the surname is "Goins").

Notable people
Spider Johnson, NFL player, born in Goin in 1907.
Bek Nelson, actress

References

Unincorporated communities in Claiborne County, Tennessee
Unincorporated communities in Tennessee